SFFILM, formerly known as The San Francisco Film Society, is a nonprofit arts organization located in San Francisco, California, that presents year-round programs and events in film exhibition, media education, and filmmaker services.

The Executive Director of the San Francisco Film Society was Noah Cowan, who joined the organization in March 2014. Prior to Cowan, Ted Hope served as executive director between August 2012 and December 2013. Prior to Hope, SFFS was headed by Bingham Ray, who served for only ten weeks before his death in January 2012. Between 2005–2011, SFFS was led by Graham Leggat until his death in August 2011.

Leadership for each of the San Francisco Film Society's areas of activity is currently provided by Director of Programming Rachel Rosen and Director of Filmmaker360 Michele Turnure-Salleo.

The San Francisco Film Society rebranded as SFFILM in 2017.

Exhibition
The San Francisco Film Society presents more than 300 films annually through various festivals, series and individual screenings.

San Francisco International Film Festival
Running for 15 days each spring, the San Francisco International Film Festival (SFIFF) was founded in 1957 by San Francisco theater operator Irving "Bud" Levin, who had attended film festivals in Cannes and Venice and decided it was time for the United States to have its own. The San Francisco International Film Festival is among the longest running film festivals in the Americas.  SFIFF celebrated its 50th anniversary in 2007.

SF Film Society Cinema
Between August 2011 and August 2012, SFFS operated SF Film Society cinema as a year-round theatrical venue with daily screenings and events in each of its program areas. The cinema was located in the New People building at 1746 Post Street in San Francisco. Film programming consisted largely of one-week runs of new independent, international and documentary features, as well as festivals, series and individual screenings.

New Italian Cinema
Since 1997, this eight-day festival has celebrated the rich cinematic tradition of Italy and its newest generation of filmmakers.

French Cinema Now
Each year since 2008, SFFS has presented the week-long French Cinema Now, which presents significant new works of international francophone cinema.

Cinema by the Bay
Launched in 2009, Cinema by the Bay annually highlights films made in or about the San Francisco Bay Area.

Taiwan Film Days
Since 2009, SFFS has presented new work from Taiwan each year at this three-day festival.

Hong Kong Cinema
This new annual festival which began in 2011 explores new work from Hong Kong.

San Francisco International Animation Festival
Between 2006–2011 SFFS presented this festival of animated film of all types.

NY/SF International Children's Film Festival
From 2010–2011 SFFS presented a film festival for Bay Area kids and families.

Quebec Film Week
In 2008 SFFS presented a five-day series of films from Quebec

KinoTek
KinoTek 2011–12 is a series of programs dedicated to cross-platform and emergent media. Starting in February 2011, SFFS presented eight KinoTek programs that featured the work of an artist or practice that challenges the boundaries of screen-based art

Education

The Film Society's Education programs serve more than 11,000 students and teachers every year, from kindergarten through college, to develop media literacy, cultural awareness, global understanding and a lifelong appreciation of cinema. Since its launch in 1991, the SFFS Youth Education program has reached a total of more than 95,000 Bay Area schoolchildren and 3,000 teachers from more than 350 educational institutions.

SFFS Education also runs an Artist in Residence program which brings a filmmaker to San Francisco for a two-week residency, featuring programming in each of the Film Society's core areas including a public screening, visits to Bay Area high school and college classrooms and opportunities to connect with local filmmakers. Filmmaker residents have included Federico Veiroj of Uruguay, Ido Haar of Israel, Oday Rasheed of Iraq, Anna Boden of the U.S. and Ashim Ahluwalia of India.

The SFFS Colleges & Universities program offers an array of creative, educational, social and professional opportunities, and connects and engages students with the Film Society and the Bay Area filmmaking community.

All programs are designed to meet the Visual and Performing Arts Content Standards for California public schools.

Filmmaker360
Filmmaker360, the San Francisco Film Society's filmmaker services program, provides support and opportunities including grants, prizes, development assistance, and residencies for working filmmakers at all stages of their careers.

Project Development
SFFS Project Development services include individual project consultation and fiscal sponsorship.

San Francisco Film Society / Kenneth Rainin Foundation Filmmaking Grants
Awarded twice annually through a partnership between the San Francisco Film Society and the Kenneth Rainin Foundation, the SFFS/KRF Filmmaking Grants are open to filmmakers of narrative feature films that have a significant economic or professional impact on the Bay Area filmmaking community.

SFFS Documentary Film Fund
A grant awarded annually to documentary feature films in postproduction.

SFFS / Hearst Screenwriting Grant
An annual grant of $15,000 to a mid-career screenwriter residing in the United States.

Djerassi / SFFS Screenwriting Fellowship
A one-month screenwriting residency awarded each year to emerging or established writers.

FilmHouse Residencies
FilmHouse provides 4,800 square feet of office space free of charge to narrative and documentary filmmakers working at any stage of production.

Other programs

SF360.org
Launched in 2006, SF360 began as a copublishing effort between the San Francisco Film Society and indieWIRE. Until its closure in 2011, SF360.org was the only daily online trade magazine focusing on the San Francisco Bay Area film scene.

References

External links

Film organizations in the United States
Cinema of the San Francisco Bay Area
Arts organizations based in the San Francisco Bay Area
Non-profit organizations based in San Francisco